Blackfen School for Girls is a girls' secondary school and sixth form with academy status, located in Blackfen in the London Borough of Bexley, England. Although it is a girls school, the sixth form over the past few years has become mixed. This is due to the partner school Hurstmere Foundation School having no sixth form, so many pupils from Hurstmere join the sixth form in Blackfen school.

Description
The headmaster is currently Matthew Brown, having previously been Louise Sharples. The school gained specialist status in Maths and Computing in 2004. Compared with many other secondary schools in the area, it is one of the highest achieving in terms of GCSE and A-level results. The percentage of students gaining five or more A* to C, including English and Mathematics was almost 64% in 2011, an 8% increase on the previous year. Five or more A* to C grades were gained by 82% of students and almost 25% of students gained three A* or A grades.

The school converted to academy status on 1 April 2012.

Ofsted considers this to be a good school and has not done a full inspection since it converted to an academy in 2012.
Ofstead reported in 2019 that the students are happy and safe, and like the way that the head teacher knows all their names and addresses them individually. They like the vertical tutor groups as it helps them integrate with everyone across the years. They like the broad and aspirational Key Stage 3 curriculum, which includes dance and drama. The school is aware that their Spanish offer is not as strong as their French. Law is one of the subjects offered as a option in Key Stage 4, and this is taught on three levels.

References

External links 
Blackfen School for Girls website

Secondary schools in the London Borough of Bexley
Girls' schools in London
Academies in the London Borough of Bexley
Buildings and structures in Sidcup